Fabiano Parisi (born 9 November 2000) is an Italian professional footballer who plays as a defender for Serie A club Empoli.

He is nicknamed "Il pendolino di Serino" by Avellino supporters and fellow team members. He is a left-footed football player.

Club career

Pro Irpinia and Vigor Perconti 
Parisi started playing football in Pro Irpina Club, based in the city of his childhood, Serino. Then he was noticed by the Roman club of Vigor Perconti, with which Parisi played for the 2016–17 season of Allievi Élite of Lazio League, winning the title and reaching the Final Six Scudetto.

Benevento 
In 2017 he was noticed by the youth sector head of Benevento, Simone Puleo, who was an historic captain of U.S. Avellino. Parisi played in the Campionato Primavera 2 collecting 18 appearances, as well as 1 in Coppa Italia Primavera and 3 in Torneo di Viareggio.

Avellino 
In the summer of 2018, Parisi joined Avellino, following the club's exclusion from Serie B and successive restart from Serie D, signing on loan from Benevento for the 2018–19 season.

In his first season, Parisi collected 41 appearances between regular season, play-off and Poule Scudetto Serie D, turned out to be decisive in several matches, and eventually being instrumental in Avellino being promoted back to Serie C on their first season of asking.

He was successively made a permanent signing for the following season. Under the guidance of Ezio Capuano as head coach, he impressed in his performances, providing assist and scoring goals, and being nominated best Under-19 football player of Group C, resulting seventh between all Serie C groups.

Empoli 
On 22 September 2020, he signed a three-year contract with Serie B club Empoli. At the end of the season he won the league with the Tuscanians, thus ensuring his first promotion to Serie A in his career.

References

External links 
 

Living people
2000 births
Sportspeople from the Province of Avellino
Italian footballers
Footballers from Campania
Association football defenders
Serie A players
Serie B players
Serie C players
Serie D players
U.S. Avellino 1912 players
Empoli F.C. players